Heintz is a surname. Notable people with the surname include:

 Anatol Heintz (1898–1975), Norwegian palaeontologist
 Bob Heintz (born 1970), American professional golfer
 Chris Heintz (baseball) (born 1974), former Major League Baseball catcher
 Chris Heintz (aeronautical engineer) (1938–2021), French and Canadian aeronautical engineer
 Emile Heintz, colleague of Michel Brunet, French paleontologist
 Fred Heintz, former Australian rules footballer
 Heintz Kluger (Haim Yavin) (born 1932), Israeli television anchor and documentary filmmaker
 Joseph Heintz the Elder (1564–1609), Swiss painter, draftsman and architect
 Kurt Heintz (1912–1944), highly decorated Hauptmann in the Luftwaffe during World War II
 Susy Heintz (born 1947), American politician from the state of Michigan
 Victor Heintz (1876–1968), U.S. Representative from Ohio and, highly decorated veteran of World War I
 Wilhelm Heinrich Heintz (1817–1880), German structural chemist
 Wulff-Dieter Heintz (1930–2006), German astronomer who moved to the United States

See also
 Freund-Heintz House, Cincinnati, Ohio, United States
 Heintz Peak, in the Welch Mountains, north of Mount Acton in Palmer Land, Antarctica
 Hentz (surnames page)

Surnames from given names